Band of Gold was a Dutch male and female vocal/instrumental group, who released a single called "Love Songs are Back Again (Medley)", which reached the UK Singles Chart. It was written and produced by Paco Saval when it was recorded in 1981 and released on the RCA label. It entered the UK chart on 14 July 1984 and peaked at #24, remaining on the chart for 11 weeks.

In the US, "Love Songs are Back Again (Medley)" was Band of Gold's only chart appearance, spending seven weeks on the Billboard Hot 100, peaking at #64 in November 1984.

References

Dutch pop music groups